The great cormorant (Phalacrocorax carbo), known as the black shag or kawau in New Zealand, formerly also known as the great black cormorant across the Northern Hemisphere, the black cormorant in Australia, and the large cormorant in India, is a widespread member of the cormorant family of seabirds. The genus name is Latinised Ancient Greek, from φαλακρός (phalakros, "bald") and κόραξ (korax, "raven"), and carbo is Latin for "charcoal".

It breeds in much of the Old World, Australia, and the Atlantic coast of North America.

Taxonomy and etymology
It is often treated as a full species, Phalacrocorax lucidus (e.g.).

In addition to the Australasian and African forms, Phalacrocorax carbo novaehollandiae and P. c. lucidus mentioned above, other geographically distinct subspecies are recognised, including P. c. sinensis (western Europe to east Asia), P. c. maroccanus (north-western Africa), and P. c. hanedae (Japan).

Some authors treat all these as allospecies of a P. carbo superspecies group.

In New Zealand, the subspecies P. c. novaehollandiae is known as the black shag or by its Māori name; "kawau". The syntype is in the collection of the Museum of New Zealand Te Papa Tongarewa.

Description
The great cormorant is a large black bird, but there is a wide variation in size in the species' wide range. Males are typically larger and heavier than females, with the nominate race (P. c. carbo) averaging about 10% larger in linear measurements than the smallest race in Europe (P. c. sinensis). The lightest average weights cited are in Germany (P. c. sinensis), where 36 males averaged  and 17 females averaged . The highest come from Prince Edward Island in Canada (P. c. carbo), where 11 males averaged  and 11 females averaged . They are tied as the second largest extant species of cormorant after the flightless cormorant, with the Japanese cormorant averaging at a similar size. In bulk if not in linear dimensions, the Blue-eyed shag species complex of the Southern Oceans are scarcely smaller at average. It has a longish tail and yellow throat-patch. Adults have white patches on the thighs and on the throat in the breeding season. In European waters it can be distinguished from the common shag by its larger size, heavier build, thicker bill, lack of a crest and plumage without any green tinge. In eastern North America, it is similarly larger and bulkier than double-crested cormorant, and the latter species has more yellow on the throat and bill and lack the white thigh patches frequently seen on great cormorants. Great cormorants are mostly silent, but they make various guttural noises at their breeding colonies.

Variations
A very rare variation of the great cormorant is caused by albinism. The Phalacrocorax carbo albino suffers from poor eyesight and/or hearing, thus it rarely manages to survive in the wild.

Distribution
This is a very common and widespread bird species. It feeds on the sea, in estuaries, and on freshwater lakes and rivers. Northern birds migrate south and winter along any coast that is well-supplied with fish.

In Serbia, the cormorant lives in Vojvodina. However, after 1945 many artificial lakes were formed in Serbia; some of them became potential habitats for cormorants. Currently, on the Lake Ćelije, formed in 1980, there is a resident colony of cormorants, who nest there and are present throughout the year, except January–February 1985 and February 2012 when the lake surface was completely frozen.

The type subspecies, P. c. carbo, is found mainly in Atlantic waters and nearby inland areas: on western European coasts and east across the Palearctic to Siberia and to North Africa, the Faroe Islands, Iceland and Greenland; and on the eastern seaboard of North America. The subspecies P. c. novaehollandiae is found in Australian waters.

Behaviour

Breeding
The great cormorant often nests in colonies near wetlands, rivers, and sheltered inshore waters. Pairs will use the same nest site to breed year after year. It builds its nest, which is made from sticks, in trees, on the ledges of cliffs, and on the ground on rocky islands that are free of predators.

This cormorant lays a clutch of three to five eggs that measure  on average. The eggs are a pale blue or green, and sometimes have a white chalky layer covering them. These eggs are incubated for a period of about 28 to 31 days.

Feeding
The great cormorant feeds on fish caught through diving. This bird feeds primarily on wrasses, but it also takes sand smelt, flathead and common soles. The average weight of fish taken by great cormorants increased with decreasing air and water temperature, being 30 g during summer, 109 g during a warm winter and 157 g during the cold winter (all values for non-breeding birds). Cormorants consume all fish of appropriate size that they are able to catch in summer and noticeably select for larger, mostly torpedo-shaped fish in winter. Thus, the winter elevation of foraging efficiency described for cormorants by various researchers is due to capturing larger fish not due to capturing more fish. In some freshwater systems, the losses of fish due to overwintering great cormorants were estimated to be up to 80 kg per ha each year (e.g. Vltava River, Czech Republic).

This cormorant forages by diving and capturing its prey in its beak. About 60% of dives are to the benthic zone and about 10% are to the pelagic zone, with the rest of the dives being to zones in between the two. Studies suggest that their hearing has evolved for underwater usage, possibly aiding their detection of fish. These adaptations also have a cost on their hearing ability in air which is of lowered sensitivity.

Relationships with humans
Many fishermen see in the great cormorant a competitor for fish. Because of this, it was hunted nearly to extinction in the past. Due to conservation efforts, its numbers increased. At the moment, there are about 1.2 million birds in Europe (based on winter counts; late summer counts would show higher numbers). Increasing populations have once again brought the cormorant into conflict with fisheries. For example, in Britain, where inland breeding was once uncommon, there are now increasing numbers of birds breeding inland, and many inland fish farms and fisheries now claim to be suffering high losses due to these birds. In the UK each year, some licences are issued to cull specified numbers of cormorants in order to help reduce predation; it is, however, still illegal to kill a bird without such a licence.

Cormorant fishing is practised in China, Japan, and elsewhere around the globe. In this practice, fishermen tie a line around the throats of cormorants, tight enough to prevent swallowing the larger fish they catch, and deploy them from small boats. The cormorants catch fish without being able to fully swallow them, and the fishermen are able to retrieve the fish simply by forcing open the cormorants' mouths, apparently engaging the regurgitation reflex.

In Norway, the cormorant is a traditional game bird. Each year approximately 10,000 cormorants are shot to be eaten. In North Norway, cormorants are traditionally seen as semi-sacred. It is regarded as good luck to have cormorants gather near your village or settlement. An old legend states that for people who die far out at sea, whose bodies are never recovered, spend eternity on the island Utrøst – which can only occasionally be found by mortals. The inhabitants of Utrøst can only visit their homes in the shape of cormorants.

Gallery

Videos

References

Further reading
 
 

Separation of carbo and sinensis
 
 
 Murray, T and Cabot, D. (2015). The Breeding Status of Great Cormorant (Phalacrocorax carbo carbo) in Co. Wexford. Ir. Nat. J. 34: 89–94.

External links

 Great cormorant Species text in The Atlas of Southern African Birds
 
 
 
 
 
 

great cormorant
Cosmopolitan birds
great cormorant
Articles containing video clips
Birds of Nepal
great cormorant
Holarctic birds